County Road 515 or County Route 515 may refer to:

County Route 515 (California)
County Road 515 (Brevard County, Florida)
County Route 515 (New Jersey)